NGC 251 is a spiral galaxy in the constellation of Pisces. It was discovered on October 15, 1784, by Frederick William Herschel.

Notes

References

External links 
 

Astronomical objects discovered in 1784
Pisces (constellation)
Spiral galaxies
002806
00490
0251
Discoveries by William Herschel